The Alvin and Grace Washburn House is a historic residence in Orem, Utah, United States, that is listed on the National Register of Historic Places (NRHP).

Description
The house is located at 753 North 100 West and was built in 1938. It is architecturally unique in Orem.

It was listed on the NRHP December 30, 1999.

See also

 National Register of Historic Places in Utah County, Utah

References

External links

Houses on the National Register of Historic Places in Utah
Traditional Native American dwellings
International style architecture in Utah
Houses completed in 1938
Houses in Orem, Utah
National Register of Historic Places in Orem, Utah
Pueblo Revival architecture
Native American history of Utah